Aatank Hi Aatank ( Terror Everywhere) is a 1995 Indian action crime film written, edited and directed by Dilip Shankar. The movie is highly inspired by The Godfather. It stars Rajinikanth, Aamir Khan, Juhi Chawla and Archana Joglekar in the lead. The film was a box office failure. In 2000, the film was dubbed into Tamil as Aandavan, with additional scenes reshot with Ponvannan, Vadivukkarasi and Chinni Jayanth lent his voice for Rajinikanth.

Plot
Shiv Charan Sharma, a farmer, moves to the city to make a life with his son Rohan, daughter Radha Seth and his wife. He meets Munna, an orphan. Shiv and Munna work hard in the underbelly of the city outside the law and go on to lead a syndicate of gangsters. Years pass by, and Shiv Charan Sharma is shown to have become an untouchable gang lord. Aslam Pathan and Billa Singh Thakur, rival crime bosses, try to kill Shiv in hopes of overtaking his territory and get rid of the opposition he was proving to be in their plans to increase drug traffic within the city.

Munna, meanwhile, falls in love with Razia, who is the daughter of Aslam Pathan. She elopes with Munna and gets married. Aslam Pathan attempts to get back at the father of the groom, by sending Gogia Advani to Shiv Charan Sharma with a drug proposition as he thinks that Shiv's acceptance of Gogia's offer would create dissent amongst the crime circles. Shiv Charan Sharma refuses, but Munna seems interested.

Shiv Charan Sharma gets shot by goons hired by Pathan and Thakur. They think that Munna will follow up on the drug deal if the father is out of the picture. However, the father survives. At this point, Rohan enters the picture with his girlfriend, Neha. He has kept away from the family business until this point. Rohan then avenges his father's shooting by taking out Gogia Advani with Munna's help. Following the shooting, Rohan is on the run, where he meets Ganga, whom he falls for too. Four years later, Rohan becomes the crime boss. In the end, Sharad Joshi takes a contract from Aslam Pathan and Billa Singh Thakur to kill Shiv, Charan Sharma, and Munna. It is to be seen how Rohan protects his brother and his father.

Cast

 Rajinikanth as Munna
 Aamir Khan as Rohan Singh Thakur
 Juhi Chawla as Neha
 Om Puri as Sharad Joshi
 Dalip Tahil as Robert
 Raza Murad as Aslam Pathan
 Goga Kapoor as Billa Singh Thakur
 Ishrat Ali as Shivcharan Sharma
 Rita Bhaduri as Mrs. Shivcharan Sharma
 Suhas Joshi as Mrs. Aslam Pathan
 Archana Joglekar as Razia Pathan
 Chandrashekhar Dubey as Durga Prasad Tiwari
 Kabir Bedi as Police Inspector (Special appearance)
 Pooja Bedi as Ganga (Special appearance)
 Radha Seth as Anju
 Firoz Irani as Masood Patel
 Vikas Anand as Mahesh
 Girja Shankar as Raka
 Bharat Kapoor as Gogia Adwani
 Joginder as Police Commissioner
 Amrit Pal as Zamindar
 Ram Mohan as Thakur
Sameer Khakhar

Production
Aatank Hi Aatank was produced by Dilip Shankar's wife, Mangal Shankar, and was initially named Aatank. Shah Rukh Khan was the original choice for the role of Rohan Singh Thakur, who didn't sign it is owing to his busy schedule. Dilip and Mangal the approached Aamir Khan, who agreed to do the film.

This is the only film to feature Aamir and Rajinikanth together.

A lot of scenes were removed from the film during post-production. An outrageous love-making scene was shot between Aamir and Pooja Bedi, which both the actors completed despite not being comfortable. Shankar removed the particular scene after several crew members and colleagues suggested him not to keep it. Shankar shot another scene showing a conflict between Aamir and Om Puri, which Aamir believed didn't make sense in the story, but completed on Shankar's persuasion. This scene, too, was removed during the editing phase after Shankar realized that Aamir was right.

Shankar escaped a fatal accident during the shoot. While shooting on the banks of river Chenab, he nearly fell into an uncovered deep well while focusing on a shot without watching his step. Shankar was saved by the stunt director.

Songs 

"O Meri Jane Jigar" - Kumar Sanu
"Mohabbat Mitt Nahin Sakti" - Kavita Krishnamurthy
"Aakha Hai Bombai" - Aparna Jha, Udit Narayan, Mohammed Aziz , Babla Mehta
"Ek Dujhe Pe Marne Wale Nahi Kisi Se Darne Wale" - Alka Yagnik, Bappi Lahiri
"Gunda Rap" - Bali Brahmbhatt, Arpita Raaj
"Tere Siva Kaun Hai Mera" - Sadhana Sargam

References

External links

1995 films
Films scored by Bappi Lahiri
1990s Hindi-language films
Works based on The Godfather
Hindi-language crime films
Indian crime action films
Indian action drama films
Indian gangster films
1990s crime action films
1995 action drama films